Biotextiles  are structures composed of textile fibers designed for use in specific biological environments where their performance depends on biocompatibility and biostability with cells and biological fluids. Biotextiles include implantable devices such as surgical sutures, hernia repair fabrics, arterial grafts, artificial skin and parts of artificial hearts.

They were first created 30 years ago by Dr. Martin W. King, a professor in North Carolina State University’s College of Textiles.

Medical textiles are a broader group which also includes bandages, wound dressings, hospital linen, preventive clothing etc.  Antiseptic biotextiles are textiles used in fighting against cutaneous bacterial proliferation.  Zeolite and triclosan are at the present time the most used molecules.  This original property allows to fightinhibits the development of odours or bacterial proliferation in the diabetic foot.

New developments 

In the new paradigm of tissue engineering, professionals are trying to develop new textiles so that the body can form new tissue around these devices so it’s not relying solely on synthetic foreign implanted material.  Graduate student Jessica Gluck has demonstrated that viable and functioning liver cells can be grown on textile scaffolds.

See also
Technical textiles

References

External links 
Dr. Martin King's Biomedical Textile Research Group at North Carolina State University’s Wilson College of Textiles
North Carolina State University’s College of Textiles on biotextiles

Biological engineering
Textiles